Mill Brook is a  stream in the White Mountains of New Hampshire in the United States. It is a tributary of the southern Swift River, part of the Bearcamp River / Ossipee Lake / Saco River watershed leading to the Atlantic Ocean.

Mill Brook rises on the southern slopes of Mount Whiteface in the town of Sandwich and flows southeast into Tamworth. The brook reaches the Swift River just east of the village of Whittier.

See also

List of rivers of New Hampshire

References

Rivers of New Hampshire
Rivers of Carroll County, New Hampshire